Deutsch or Deutsche may refer to:

Deutsch or (das) Deutsche: the German language, in Germany and other places
Deutsche: Germans, as a weak masculine, feminine or plural demonym
Deutsch (word), originally referring to the Germanic vernaculars of the Early Middle Ages

Businesses and organisations 

André Deutsch, an imprint of Carlton Publishing Group
Deutsch Inc., a former American advertising agency that split in 2020 into:
Deutsch NY, a New York City-based advertising agency
Deutsche Aerospace AG
Deutsche Akademie, a cultural organisation, superseded by the Goethe-Institut
Deutsche Bahn, the German railway service
Deutsche Bank
Deutsche Börse, a German stock exchange
Deutsche Geophysikalische Gesellschaft, the German Geophysical Society
Deutsche Grammophon, a German classical music record label
Deutsch Group, an international connector manufacturer
Deutsche Luft Hansa (1926–1945)
Deutsche Lufthansa (since 1953), an airline
Deutsche Marine, the German Navy
Deutsche Post, the German postal service
Deutsche Telekom
Deutsche Welle, Germany's public international broadcaster
Deutscher Filmpreis, a film awards ceremony
Verlag Harri Deutsch, a former German publishing house

Other uses
Deutsch, a village in the German municipality of Groß Garz
Deutsch (crater), a crater on the far side of the Moon
Deutsch (surname), shared by several people
Deutsch catalogue of compositions by Franz Schubert, see Schubert Thematic Catalogue

See also 
Deitsch (disambiguation)
Deutscher
Deutz (disambiguation)
Dietsch (disambiguation)
Dutch (disambiguation)
German (disambiguation)